Grzesiak is a surname. Notable people with the surname include:

 Anna Grzesiak (born 1987), Polish triathlete